John Thomas Finley (August 14, 1903 – September 5, 1933) was an American Negro league third baseman in the 1920s and 1930s.

A native of St. Augustine, Florida, Finley made his Negro leagues debut in 1922 with the Bacharach Giants. He went on to play for several teams, including the Lincoln Giants and Brooklyn Royal Giants, and finished his career in 1933 with the Philadelphia Stars. Finley died in Philadelphia, Pennsylvania in 1933 at age 30.

References

External links
 and Baseball-Reference Black Baseball stats and Seamheads

1903 births
1933 deaths
Bacharach Giants players
Baltimore Black Sox players
Brooklyn Royal Giants players
Lincoln Giants players
Philadelphia Stars players
Washington Potomacs players
Baseball third basemen
Baseball players from Florida
People from St. Augustine, Florida
20th-century African-American sportspeople